Andrej Nikolaidis (born 1974) is a Montenegrin-Bosnian novelist, columnist, and political adviser. His novel Sin (The Son) won the European Union Prize for Literature in 2011. The English translation was published in 2013 by Istros Books in the United Kingdom.

From October 2009 to February 2014 he was adviser to Ranko Krivokapić, speaker of the Montenegrin Parliament.

Biography

Nikolaidis was born and raised in Sarajevo, SR Bosnia and Herzegovina, SFR Yugoslavia into a Montenegrin family. In 1992, following the breakout of the Bosnian War, Nikolaidis's family moved to the Montenegrin town of Ulcinj, his father's hometown , where he owns a summer house. An ardent supporter of Montenegrin independence, anti-war activist and promoter of human rights, especially minority rights, Nikolaidis initially became known for his political views and public feuds, appearing on local television and in newspapers with his razor-sharp political commentaries. His writings for Monitor and Slobodna Bosna aroused controversy and he "received threats, including death threats, after publishing several articles about “facing the past.” During a talk show on Radio Antena M, one of the listeners, while on air, said that he would kill Nikolaidis." 

Nikolaidis has published four novels in Montenegro and Croatia: Mimesis (Durieux, OKF, 2003), Son (Durieux, 2006), The Coming (Algoritam, 2009) and Till Kingdom Come (Algoritam, 2012) as well as collections of short stories The Cathedral in Seattle, Why Mira Furlan?, A Short History of Madness and a cultural theory book "Homo Sucker: The Poetics of Apocalypse". 
In 2012, two of his novels ('The Coming' and 'The Son') were published in English by the UK publisher Istros Books. In 2014, a German edition of "The Coming", "Die Ankunft", was published by Voland & Quist.
His first critically acclaimed novel "Mimesis" was very well received in Croatia, Bosnia and among liberal Montenegrin intellectuals, where local independent media compares his expression and attitude to the one of Thomas Bernhard. He wrote columns for pro-independence Montenegrin publications such as Vijesti daily newspaper, Monitor weekly newsmagazine (from 2002 until 2009), and Crnogorski književni list weekly newspaper, as well as Bosnian weekly newsmagazine Slobodna Bosna. He now resides in Ulcinj, Montenegro.

On October 15, 2009, it was announced that Nikolaidis accepted a job as the adviser to politician Ranko Krivokapić, who has been the speaker of the house in Montenegrin Parliament since 2003 and is the president of SDP CG party - ruling coalition's junior partner. The announcement came couple of weeks after Krivokapić publicly supported Nikolaidis while criticizing the Montenegrin Supreme Court's final ruling in Kusturica vs. Nikolaidis case. Nikolaidis resigned in February 2014.

Controversy

Emir Kusturica
On May 28, 2004, Nikolaidis's highly charged piece titled "Dželatov šegrt" (Executioner's Apprentice) was published as part of his regular column in Monitor weekly magazine. In it, he targeted film director Emir Kusturica, denouncing him, among other things, as one of the "biggest media stars of the time when Milošević's war propaganda propped people who had something stupid but patriotic to say and created news for people who were insensitive to human suffering, blind to their own guilt, and finally stupid enough to believe in their own righteousness".

Nikolaidis was subsequently sued by Kusturica for libel. After the trial in November 2004, primary court (Osnovni sud) in Podgorica under presiding judge Evica Durutović awarded Kusturica €5,000 in damages. However, on appeal, the verdict against Nikolaidis had been overruled by the higher court (Viši sud) in December 2005 and the case was returned to the lower court for a re-trial.

In late November 2007 the primary court (Osnovni sud) confirmed the previous verdict following a re-trial. Nikoladis again appealed the primary court verdict and the case was heard for the second time by the higher court (Viši sud) in April 2008 and this time it upheld the primary court verdict, ordering Nikolaids to pay the damages. In reaction to the verdict, Nikolaidis received individual support from Bosnia and Herzegovina where actor Emir Hadžihafizbegović and journalist Šemsudin "Šeki" Radončić raised funds to pay the Nikolaidis's fine.

Republika Srpska
In a January 11, 2012 article titled "What is Left of Greater Serbia," Nikolaidis wrote: "What would be, in B&H, in this case, true civilized step? Obviously, to global, uber-state, and uber-national institutions put justice ahead of pragmatism and ethics of profit, and conduct abolition, if needed by force, of Republika Srpska. [...] Civilised step would be if Bole used dynamite and rifles which he hid in the ballroom in which leaders, spiritual people, and artists celebrated 20th anniversary of existence of Republika Srpska."

Awards and honors
2011: European Union Prize for Literature, winner Montenegro, Sin (The Son)

Published works 
 Mimesis, 2003
 Sin (The Son), 2006
 Balkanska Rapsodija (Balkan Rhapsody), 2007
 Mimesis i drugi skandali (Mimesis and Other Scandals), 2008
 Dolazak (The Coming), 2009
 Homo Sucker : Poetika Apokalipse, 2010
 Odlaganje. Parezija, 2012
 Mala enciklopedija ludila (The Small Encyclopedia of Madness), 2013
 Devet (Till Kingdom Come), 2014
 Smjena straže (The Changing of the Guard), 2015
 Mađarska rečenica (The Hungarian Sentence), 2017

References

External links 
 Article in the Economist, 22 May 2012
 Author's Page on Istros Books' website (UK Publisher)

1974 births
Living people
Writers from Sarajevo
Bosnia and Herzegovina novelists
Bosnia and Herzegovina people of Greek descent
Bosnia and Herzegovina people of Montenegrin descent
Bosnia and Herzegovina short story writers
Montenegrin writers
Montenegrin male writers
Montenegrin_people_of_Greek_descent